Kalamaria Stadium is a multi-purpose stadium in Kalamaria, a district of Thessaloniki, in Greece.

It is currently used mostly for football matches and is the home stadium of Apollon Kalamarias.

The stadium was built in 1973; renovations were made in 2003, prior to the 2004 Summer Olympics, as the stadium was used as one of the official training venues for the Olympics' football competition.

The stadium's capacity is 6,500.

References

External links
 Kalamaria Stadium profile at Stadia.gr

Football venues in Greece
Multi-purpose stadiums in Greece
Apollon Pontou FC
Sports venues in Thessaloniki